Charles Sumner Sedgwick (1856 – March 12, 1922) was an American architect based in Minneapolis, Minnesota.

Personal life
He was born in New York State. His wife, Mary D., was born in the 1850s and died in 1920. Sedgwick died in 1922 at St. Barnabas Hospital in Minnesota, after several years of illness with Bright's disease.

Career
He started his career as an architect in Binghamton, New York and moved to Minneapolis in 1884 and completed several projects in the city and surrounding areas and states. Several of his works are listed on the National Register of Historic Places. Sedgwick is a designated Minneapolis master architect by the city's heritage preservation authority.

Works
Sedgwick was most known for his residential commissions, but also designed churches, school buildings, and commercial structures.

George W. Baird House (1886), Edina, Minnesota, NRHP-listed 
Como Congregational Church (1886), Minneapolis, Minnesota 
George R. Newell House (1888), 1818 LaSalle Ave., Minneapolis, MN (Sedgwick, Charles), NRHP-listed
First National Bank (1889), 501 St. Germain St., St. Cloud, MN (Sedgwick, Charles), NRHP-listed
Old Arkansas City High School (1890), Arkansas City, Kansas, formerly the Arkansas City High School building and now Ireland Hall at Cowley Community College;  NRHP-listed
Andrew Presbyterian Church (1890), at Fourth Street and Eighth Avenue, Minneapolis, patterned after St. Giles in Scotland.  Demolished c.2002.
Nehemiah P. Clarke House (1892–93), 356 3rd Ave., S., St. Cloud, MN (Sedgwick, Charles S.), NRHP-listed
Westminster Presbyterian Church (1897), 1201–1213 Nicollet Mall with Warren H. Hayes, NRHP-listed
Dayton's (1902) at 700 Nicollet Mall in Minneapolis (later converted to a Macy's before closing down)
Burton Hall (University of Minnesota) interior at the University of Minnesota (1895) with Leroy Buffington designing the exterior. The building was formerly used as a library

Budge Hall (1899 – demolished 1981) and Science Hall (renamed Minard Hall in honor of Dean A. E. Minard) at North Dakota State University Minard Hall has been added on to and extensively renovated over the years.
William F. Bruell House (1902), Address Restricted, Redfield, South Dakota (Sedgwick & Saxton), NRHP-listed
Four story commercial building at 256 1st Avenue North (1902) in Minneapolis
Morris Carnegie Library (1905), Nevada and 6th Sts., Morris, MN (Sedgwick & Saxton), NRHP-listed
Old Waconia City Hall (1909), 9 W. 1st St. in Waconia, Minnesota, NRHP-listed
First Lutheran Church (1916) 434 First Street Southwest in Blooming Prairie, Minnesota
Park Avenue Covenant Church, Minneapolis
Park Avenue Congregational Church, at Park and Franklin Avenues, Minneapolis
Lowry Hill Congregational Church, at Dupont and Franklin Avenue, Minneapolis
Fourth Baptist Church, at 2105 Fremont Avenue North, Minneapolis

Notes

References

Architects from Minneapolis
19th-century American architects
20th-century American architects
1856 births
1922 deaths
Architects from New York (state)